Ernst-Johannes Põdder VR I/1 (10 February 1879 – 24 June 1932) was a famous Estonian military commander in the Estonian War of Independence.

In 1900 Põdder graduated from the Vilnius Military Academy. In the Russo-Japanese war he achieved the rank of Lieutenant, and in World War I became Polkovnik (Colonel). In July 1917 he joined the Estonian national units as commander of the 3rd and 1st Estonian regiments. In 1918 Põdder was promoted to the rank of Major General. During the German occupation of 1918, he was one of the main founders of the underground Defence League. At the beginning of the Estonian Liberation War, Põdder was Chief of Internal Security. On April 4, 1919, he became Commander of the 3rd Division, where his main achievement was a victory over the Baltische Landeswehr.

After the war, Põdder commanded the 3rd Division and, after 1921, the 2nd Division. He actively participated in defeating the 1924 coup attempt. In 1926 he became a permanent member of the war council, as well as an active organizer of scouting. Ernst Põdder was the only honorary member of the League of Liberators. Põdder was a recipient of the Latvian military Order of Lāčplēsis, 2nd class.

See also 

Estonian War of Independence
Battle of Wenden
Freikorps in the Baltic

References

 Kindralmajor Ernst Põdder
 Ülo Kaevats et al. 2000. Eesti Entsüklopeedia 14. Tallinn: Eesti Entsüklopeediakirjastus, 

1879 births
1932 deaths
People from Tartu
People from Kreis Dorpat
Members of the Vaps Movement
Estonian major generals
Imperial Russian Army officers
Russian military personnel of the Russo-Japanese War
Russian military personnel of World War I
Estonian military personnel of the Estonian War of Independence
Recipients of the Order of St. Vladimir, 4th class
Recipients of the Order of St. Anna, 2nd class
Recipients of the Order of St. Anna, 3rd class
Recipients of the Order of St. Anna, 4th class
Recipients of the Order of Saint Stanislaus (Russian), 2nd class
Recipients of the Order of Saint Stanislaus (Russian), 3rd class
Recipients of the Cross of Liberty (Estonia)
Recipients of the Military Order of the Cross of the Eagle, Class I
Recipients of the Order of Lāčplēsis, 2nd class
Recipients of the Order of Lāčplēsis, 3rd class